The Fijian Government exercises the executive functions and powers within the Republic of Fiji. This article lists spans of government ministries under a prime minister. The distinctive periods of these ministries consist of post-independence, post-2000 Coup d'état , and post 2006 Coup d'état .

Ministries

See also
Cabinet of Fiji

References 

Government of Fiji
Politics of Fiji
History of Fiji